Percarina is a genus of ray-finned fish in the family Percidae found in eastern Europe. The genus is the only taxon in the monotypic subfamily Percarininae, which is characterised by having the first dorsal fin, having 9-11 spines and being widely separated from the second dorsal fin. They are thought to be closely related both to the perches of the genus Perca and to the ruffes of the genus Gymnocephalus.

Species
There are currently two recognised species in the genus:
 Percarina demidoffii Nordmann, 1840 (Common percarina)
 Percarina maeotica Kuznetsov, 1888 (Azov percarina)

References

 
Percidae
Taxa named by Alexander von Nordmann
Taxonomy articles created by Polbot